Ivan Baranchyk (born 24 January 1993) is a Belarusian professional boxer who held the IBF light-welterweight title from 2018 to 2019.

Professional career

Baranchyk vs. Yigit 
Baranchyk amassed a record of 18-0 before entering season 2 of the World Boxing Super Series. In his opening round match-up, he defeated Anthony Yigit via seventh-round corner retirement to win the vacant IBF light welterweight title.

Baranchyk vs. Taylor 
In the semi-final of the World Boxing Super Series on 18 May 2019, Baranchyk faced Josh Taylor at The SSE Hydro in Glasgow, Scotland, where he suffered his first professional defeat, losing to Taylor via unanimous decision with scores of 115-111, 115-111, and 117-109.

Baranchyk vs. Bracero 
Baranchyk rebounded from his loss against Taylor with a fourth-round technical knockout victory against Gabriel Bracero on 5 October 2019, on the undercard of Gennady Golovkin vs. Sergiy Derevyanchenko.

Baranchyk vs. Zepeda 
Baranchyk went on to lose his next two bouts, first one against Jose Zepeda on 3 October 2020 via fifth-round knockout. Zepeda was ranked #2 by the WBC, #3 by the WBO and #6 by The Ring at super lightweight.

Baranchyk vs. Love 
In his next bout Baranchyk lost by Montana Love on 29 August 2021 via seventh-round corner retirement.

Professional boxing record

See also
List of light-welterweight boxing champions

References

External links

Ivan Baranchyk - Profile, News Archive & Current Rankings at Box.Live

1993 births
Living people
Belarusian male boxers
Light-welterweight boxers
Welterweight boxers
World light-welterweight boxing champions
International Boxing Federation champions